This is a list of cities in North America. For the most populous cities in North America, see List of North American cities by population.

Antigua and Barbuda

Aruba

Oranjestad

Bahamas

Nassau
Freeport City

Barbados

Bridgetown
Speightstown

Belize

Belize City
Belmopan

Bermuda

British Virgin Islands

Canada

Toronto
Montreal
Vancouver
Ottawa
Calgary
Edmonton
Winnipeg
Halifax

Cayman Islands

George Town

Costa Rica

Cuba

Havana
Santiago de Cuba

Dominica

Roseau

Dominican Republic

Santo Domingo
Santiago de los Caballeros
San Felipe de Puerto Plata

El Salvador

San Salvador
San Miguel
Santa Ana

Greenland

Nuuk
Sisimiut
Ilulissat
Qaqortoq
Aasiaat

Grenada

Guatemala

Guatemala City

Haiti

Port-au-Prince
Delmas
Pétion-Ville
Cap-Haïtien
Gonaïves
Port-de-Paix
Jacmel
Les Cayes
Jérémie

Honduras

Tegucigalpa
San Pedro Sula
Choloma
La Ceiba
El Progreso
Choluteca
Comayagua
Puerto Cortés
La Lima
Danlí

Jamaica

Kingston
Montego Bay
Spanish Town
Portmore
Ocho Rios

Mexico

Mexico City
Guadalajara
Monterrey
Puebla
Toluca
Tijuana
Chihuahua
Juárez
León
Torreón
San Luis Potosí
Mérida
Acapulco
Cancún
Los Cabos
Cuernavaca
Pachuca
Querétaro

Montserrat

Netherlands Antilles

Nicaragua

Managua
Leon

Panama

Puerto Rico

San Juan

Saint Kitts and Nevis

Saint Lucia

Castries

Saint-Pierre and Miquelon

Saint Vincent and the Grenadines

Trinidad and Tobago

Port of Spain
San Fernando
Chaguanas
Arima
Couva
Point Fortin
Scarborough
Tunapuna
Diego Martin
Princes Town
Penal
Siparia
San Juan
Sangre Grande
Mayaro

Turks and Caicos Islands

Cockburn Town

United States

Boston, Massachusetts
New York City
Philadelphia, Pennsylvania
Washington, D.C.
Chicago, Illinois
Detroit, Michigan
New Orleans, Louisiana
Miami, Florida
Atlanta, Georgia
Dallas, Texas
Houston, Texas
Las Vegas, Nevada
Los Angeles, California
San Francisco, California
Seattle, Washington

United States Virgin Islands

Charlotte Amalie

See also
North America
List of North American cities by year of foundation
List of the largest urban agglomerations in North America
List of North American metropolitan areas by population
List of Metropolitan Statistical Areas
Lists of cities
Largest cities in the Americas
Cities of present-day nations and states
 List of cities by continent
 List of cities in South America
 List of cities in Africa
 List of cities in Asia
 List of cities in Europe
 List of cities in Oceania

References

 
Cities
North America